The Australian Aboriginal Flag represents Aboriginal Australians. It is one of the officially proclaimed flags of Australia, by which it has special legal and political status together with the national flag and the Torres Strait Islander Flag, with which it is often flown.

The flag was designed in 1971 by Harold Thomas, an Aboriginal artist who is descended from the Luritja people of Central Australia. Thomas held the intellectual property rights to the flag's design until January 2022, when he transferred the copyright to the Commonwealth government. The flag was designed for the land rights movement and became a symbol of Aboriginal people of Australia.

The flag is horizontally and equally divided into a black region (above) and a red region (below); a yellow disc is superimposed over the centre of the flag. The overall proportions of the flag, as proclaimed, are 2:3;  however, the flag is often reproduced in the proportions 1:2 as with the Australian National Flag.

Status
The Government of Australia granted it "Flag of Australia" status, under the Flags Act 1953, by proclamation on 14 July 1995. Due to an "administrative oversight", the 1995 proclamation was not lodged so that it would continue in force indefinitely; hence it automatically expired on 1 January 2008. It was therefore almost identically replaced, on 25 January 2008, with effect as from 1 January.

In the 2008 proclamation, the flag "is recognised as the flag of the Aboriginal peoples of Australia and a flag of significance to the Australian nation generally" and appointed "to be the flag of the Aboriginal peoples of Australia and to be known as the Australian Aboriginal Flag".  The design is reproduced in Schedule 1 and described in Schedule 2.

Design

Symbolic meaning
The symbolic meaning of the flag colours (as stated by Harold Thomas) is:

Colours 

The official colour specifications of the Australian Aboriginal Flag are:

In most cases, on-screen or digital reproductions of the flag should use the RGB colours as in the table above.  When displaying in physical fabric formats, it is much preferred to use the Pantone specifications. When printing on paper, the CMYK colours are superior.

History

The flag was first flown on National Aborigines Day in Victoria Square in Adelaide on 9 July 1971. It was also used in Canberra at the Aboriginal Tent Embassy from late 1972. In the early months of the embassy—which was established in February that year—other designs were used, including a black, green and red flag made by supporters of the South Sydney Rabbitohs rugby league club, and a flag with a red-black field containing a spear and four crescents in yellow.

Cathy Freeman caused controversy at the 1994 Commonwealth Games by carrying the Aboriginal flag as well as the Australian national flag during her victory lap of the arena, after winning the 200 metres sprint; only the national flag is meant to be displayed. Despite strong criticism from both Games officials and Australian team president Arthur Tunstall, Freeman carried both flags again after winning the 400 metres.

The decision in 1995 by Labor Prime Minister Paul Keating that the Aboriginal and Torres Strait Islander flags should be given the status of national flags was opposed by the Liberal Opposition at the time, Opposition Leader John Howard stating that "any attempt to give the flags official status under the Flags Act would rightly be seen by many in the community not as an act of reconciliation but as a divisive gesture". Nonetheless, since Howard became Prime Minister in 1996 and under subsequent Labor governments, these flags have remained national flags. However, this decision was differently criticised by the designer of the flag, Harold Thomas, who said that the Aboriginal flag "doesn't need any more recognition".

The National Indigenous Advisory Committee campaigned for the Aboriginal flag to be flown at Stadium Australia during the 2000 Summer Olympics. The Olympics organisers announced that the Aboriginal flag would be flown at Olympic venues. The flag has been flown over the Sydney Harbour Bridge during the march for reconciliation of 2000 and many other events, including Australia Day. On 4 February 2022, the New South Wales government announced that the flag would be flown from the Harbour Bridge permanently.

On the 30th anniversary of the flag in 2001, thousands of people were involved in a ceremony where the flag was carried from the Parliament of South Australia to Victoria Square.

Use

Public buildings and locations
The first city council to fly the Aboriginal flag was Newcastle City Council in 1977.

On 8 July 2002 the Adelaide City Council endorsed the permanent flying of the Aboriginal flag close to the location of its first raising at Victoria Square in 1971 (now dual-named Tarntanyangga), which now flies adjacent to the Australian flag. It has also been flown in front of Adelaide Town Hall since the same date.

Various councils in Australian towns fly the Aboriginal flag from the town halls, such as Bendigo (adopted in 2005). The flag is also flown at many other public buildings such as a number of the state Parliament Houses including that of Victoria.

In April 2021 Regional NSW Police Deputy Commissioner Gary Worboys said that he would like to see the flag flown at every New South Wales Police regional police station in the state, expanding from the 12 of the 89 then flying it.

The Australian Aboriginal flag has been hoisted alongside the Australian national flag as a permanent feature of the Australian Embassy in Dublin, Ireland, since 5 March 2021.

Following the 2022 Australian federal election on 21 May 2022, the incoming Anthony Albanese led Labor government started displaying the Aboriginal flag and the Torres Strait Islander flag alongside the national flag at ministerial press conferences. Upon the opening of the new Parliament, both flags began to be displayed in the House of Representatives and Senate chambers.

From 27 May 2022, at the start of National Reconciliation Week, both the Aboriginal and Torres Strait Islander flags were hoisted on the front lawn of Government House, Adelaide, to be permanently flown alongside the national flag and the South Australian flag.

Other authorised uses
The sale of condoms in the colours of the Aboriginal flag won a public health award in 2005 for the initiative's success in improving safe sex practices among young Indigenous people.

Aboriginal-designed emojis titled Indigemojis and including the flag on several designs, were released in December 2019 via an app, with the permission of Harold Thomas.

Proposed, unauthorised and other uses

The Aboriginal flag is sometimes substituted for the Union Flag in the canton of Australia's flag in proposed new Australian flag designs. Harold Thomas said of this idea: "I wouldn′t reject it out of hand, but I could make a decision to say no. Our flag is not a secondary thing. It stands on its own, not to be placed as an adjunct to any other thing. It shouldn't be treated that way".

In the science fiction film Event Horizon, actor Sam Neill, himself a New Zealander, designed a flag for use on his sleeve as the way he thought the Australian flag should look in 2047, which incorporated the Aboriginal flag.

The Australian Aboriginal Flag is celebrated in the painting The First Supper (1988) by Susan Dorothea White where the central figure is an Aboriginal woman who displays the flag on her T-shirt.

The flag was to be part of the logo on Google Australia's home page on Australia Day 2010, but the company was forced to modify the design due to its creator Harold Thomas demanding payment if Google were to use it.

The anti-Islamic group Reclaim Australia used the flag at their protests in 2015, which was condemned by the flag's creator, Harold Thomas, who called it "idiotic".

Copyright

Copyright in the flag has been subject to controversy, as to original and ongoing ownership of the copyright.

1977: copyright granted to Thomas
In 1997, in the case of Thomas v Brown and Tennant, the Federal Court of Australia declared that Harold Thomas was the owner of copyright in the design of the Australian Aboriginal flag, and thus the flag has protection under Australian copyright law. Thomas had sought legal recognition of his ownership and compensation following the Federal Government's 1995 proclamation of the design, and his claim was contested by two others, George Brown and James Tennant. After winning copyright, Thomas awarded rights solely to Carroll & Richardson – Flagworld Pty Ltd and Birubi Art Pty Ltd for the manufacture and marketing of the flag and of products featuring the flag's image.

In November 2018, Thomas granted WAM Clothing (which is co-owned by Birubi Art owner Ben Wooster) a licence for the use of the flag on clothing. In June 2019, it was reported that WAM Clothing had demanded that Aboriginal-owned businesses stop selling clothing that featured the flag. They also sent notices to the NRL and AFL about their use of the flag on Indigenous round jerseys. In June 2020, after a prominent Aboriginal footballer began selling WAM-licensed teeshirts bearing the flag through his own website, Aboriginal former senator Nova Peris, a leader of a "free the flag" campaign, wrote to the Governor-General, requesting his support for divesting WAM of the copyright.

After consultation with its Aboriginal and Torres Strait Islander Advisory Council, the AFL did not enter into a commercial agreement with WAM in 2020, in line with general Aboriginal sentiment on the issue. In August 2020, Ken Wyatt, Minister for Indigenous Australians, said that he would love to see the flag freely used across Australia, and former AFL player Michael Long said its absence would have a negative effect on the players in the Sir Doug Nicholls Indigenous Round. Wyatt encouraged spectators to bring flags to the games, beginning in Darwin on 22 August 2020.

2022: copyright transfer to Commonwealth
On 24 January 2022, the Commonwealth government announced, after more than three years of confidential negotiations, that Thomas had transferred the copyright in the flag to the Commonwealth. The federal government paid $20.05m to Thomas and licence holders (including WAM Clothing and Carroll and Richardson Flagworld) to extinguish existing licences and secure copyright. As part of the copyright transfer, Thomas retained moral rights over the flag (which include the right to be identified as its creator). Following the copyright transfer, Carroll and Richardson Flagworld continued to be the exclusive manufacturer, although individuals may make copies for personal use.

The Commonwealth agreed to fund a scholarship in Thomas's name for Indigenous students to further the development of Indigenous governance and leadership and an online education portal on the flag's history. An original painting by Thomas detailing the transfer of copyright would be "displayed in a prominent location" by the Commonwealth.  All royalties from the copyright are to be transferred to the National Aborigines and Islanders Day Observance Committee, and $2m would be devoted to establishing a not-for-profit organisation that will make periodic payments for activities related to the flag.

About the use of the flag, the government statement reads:

Many Aboriginal people celebrated the freeing of the flag; however, Bronwyn Carlson, Professor of Indigenous Studies and Director of the Centre for Global Indigenous Futures at Macquarie University, expressed a contrary opinion, suggesting that to "free" the flag for all and sundry may demean it as a symbol of Aboriginal identity and history. She wrote in The Conversation: "the Aboriginal flag has always been our flag. We didn't need an act of parliament to recognise its significance." Some Indigenous people are not happy to see the federal government have control of the flag, rather than an Indigenous organisation, and law professor Isabella Alexander said that some legal questions remained, for as long as details of the agreement were still commercial-in-confidence. Upon the release by the Australian government of the Assignment Deed following an FOI application, David J. Brennan has identified a likelihood that the Australian copyright in the 1971 flag as an artistic work expired upon transfer to the Commonwealth.

The flag's current legal status was debated in an Australian Senate estimates committee in mid‑February 2022, when it was also revealed that the Morrison government had paid $13.75m to Thomas to assume copyright, and also paid $6.3m to two non-Indigenous businesses which held licences to use the flag. These companies are WAM Clothing, which received $5.2m, and Wooster Holdings, which was paid $1.1m. Interests in both companies are held by Gold Coast businessman Ben Wooster, former director of Birubi Art (which was fined $23m in 2018 for selling fake Aboriginal art).

See also

 Flags of Australia
 Torres Strait Islander Flag
Ethnic flag

References

Further reading

 

 The Sydney Morning Herald, 3 September 1994. Australian Aboriginal and Torres Strait Islander Commission. 1992, 'Torres Strait gets a flag and a major land rights victory', ATSIC News, vol.2, no. 4, p. 5.
 Australian Flags 1995, Department of Administrative Services, Australian Government Publishing Service, Canberra.
 Horton, D. (ed.) Encyclopaedia of Aboriginal Australia, Aboriginal Studies Press, Canberra, 1994.
 Australian flags Australian Government website, It's an Honour
 The First Supper:  painting, 1988, by Susan Dorothea White. Features an Aboriginal woman wearing a T-shirt bearing the Aboriginal Land Rights flag.

External links
 AIATSIS: The Aboriginal Flag 

Flags introduced in 1971
Australian Aboriginal culture
Flags of Australia
Flags of indigenous peoples
Indigenous Australian politics
1995 establishments in Australia
Ethnic flags